Montana Austria was an airline based in Vienna, Austria and existed between 1975 and 1981.

History
Montana Austria was founded in 1975 by Captain Hans Stöckl and started using two Boeing 707 aircraft. The company's name was chosen to reflect the mountainous landscape in Austria. A third Boeing 707 aircraft was acquired in 1977. In the beginning, Montana Austria faced bureaucratic difficulties since the then-national monopoly airline Austrian Airlines tried to obstruct any competition. 

Finally in November 1976, the airline was granted to serve the Vienna-Baghdad-Bangkok route. Additional routes to other destinations, such as New York, were introduced later. Montana Austria operated only long-haul routes which were not served by Austrian Airlines in the 1970s and thus were considered as a niche in the airline business of Austria back then.

Since the number of passengers started to decrease in the late 1970s and early 1980s due to an economic crisis, Montana Austria switched its activities from passenger services to cargo transportation. The only passenger service to remain was the one to New York.

One of the company's cargo aircraft was loaded with illegal weapons in Houston, Texas and was impounded by US authorities. After the main investor Carl Press of the German freight forwarding company Deugro withdrew his financial support Montana Austria went into receivership and ceased operations. Eventually the Austrian government revoked the airline's operating license. Montana Austria ceased operations in July 1981.

Destinations

Montana Austria served the following scheduled destinations:
 Baghdad, Iraq
 Bangkok Thailand
 New York City, United States
 Vienna, Austria

Fleet 
2 Boeing 707-138B (increased range passenger version acquired from Qantas)
1 Boeing 707-396C (cargo aircraft)

References

Defunct airlines of Austria
Airlines established in 1975
Airlines disestablished in 1981
1981 disestablishments in Austria
Austrian companies established in 1975